Jahan Temür was a Jalayirid puppet for the throne of the Ilkhanate in the late 1330s.

Life 
He was son of Alafrang and the grandson of Gaykhatu and Jalayirid Dondi Khatun. His family was fallen out favor after Ghazan's ascension to the throne. His brother-in-law Eljigitei was executed by Ghazan in 1295, father Alafrang was murdered on 30 May 1304 during reign of Öljaitü. He must have been an elderly person when Jalayirid Hasan Buzurg raised him to the throne in 1339 near Hamadan. His rule were acknowledged from Basra to Samsun.

Hasan Buzurg and his Jahan Temür khan met the Chobanids under Hasan Kucek in battle on 21 June 1340 near the Jaghatu plains; the Jalayirids were defeated. Following this, Hasan Buzurg returned to Baghdad and deposed Jahan Temür. While Hasan Buzurg would recognize Togha Temur as his suzerain again for a time, Jahan Temür was his last puppet Ilkhan, and the Jalayirid (Ilkan) dynasty of Baghdad came to rule in its own right. The fate of Jahan Temür himself is not recorded.

References

Il-Khan emperors
14th-century monarchs in Asia